Al-Sultaniyah Madrasa, is a madrasah complex located across from the Citadel entrance in the Ancient city of Aleppo, Syria. It is a religious, educational and funerary complex. It contains the tomb of sultan Malik al-Zaher the son of Ayyubid Sultan Saladin.  However, satellite pictures show it has been bombed out of existence.

See also
 Al-Firdaws Madrasa
 Al-Uthmaniyah Madrasa
 Al-Zahiriyah Madrasa
 Ancient City of Aleppo
 Khusruwiyah Mosque
 History of medieval Arabic and Western European domes

References

Religious buildings and structures completed in 1223
Ayyubid architecture in Syria
Mausoleums in Syria
Madrasas in Aleppo
13th-century madrasas